Stephen Joel Pratt (born 8 July 1984) is an Australian politician and former local government councilor and senior ministerial advisor.

At the 2021 Western Australian state election, Pratt was elected to the Western Australian Legislative Council as a Labor member for South Metropolitan.

References 

Living people
Members of the Western Australian Legislative Council
Australian Labor Party members of the Parliament of Western Australia
21st-century Australian politicians
1984 births